Let the Light Shine Down is a compilation album by the progressive bluegrass band Country Gentlemen released in 1991. It contains songs from recordings from 1962 to 1976.

Track listing
 Let the Light Shine Down (Swan) 1:54
 Lord Don't Leave Me Here (Jones) 2:19
 Waiting for the Boys to Come Home (Presley) 2:24
 Along the Way (Duffey) 2:50
 I'd Rather Live by the Side of the Road (Albert Brumley) 3:10
 Take Me in a Lifeboat (Frank Southern) 2:40
 Crying Holy (Traditional) 2:07
 Preachin', Prayin', Singin' (McCarty) 1:45
 These Men of God (Williams) 2:23
 Working on a Road (Lester Flatt) 2:50
 Heavenward Bound (John Duffey) 2:16
 Paul and Silas (Traditional) 1:45
 When They Ring Those Golden Bells (Traditional) 2:57
 Beautiful Life (Golden) 2:38

Personnel
 Charlie Waller - guitar, vocals
 John Duffey - mandolin, guitar, vocals
 Eddie Adcock - banjo, vocals
 Tom Gray - bass, vocals
 Mike Auldridge - Dobro

References

External links
 https://web.archive.org/web/20091215090142/http://www.lpdiscography.com/c/Cgentlemen/cgent.htm

The Country Gentlemen compilation albums
1991 compilation albums
Rebel Records compilation albums